The 2018 Central League Climax Series (CLCS) was a post-season playoff consisting of two consecutive series that determined who would represent the Central League in the Japan Series. The First Stage was a best-of-three series and the Final Stage was a best-of-six with the top seed being awarded a one-win advantage. The winner of the series advanced to the 2018 Japan Series, where they competed against the 2018 Pacific League Climax Series winner. The top three regular-season finishers played in the two series. The CLCS began with the first game of the First Stage on October 13.

First stage

Summary

Game 1

Game 2

Final stage

Summary

* The Central League regular season champion is given a one-game advantage in the Final Stage.

Game 1

Game 2

Game 3

References

Climax Series
Central League Climax Series